Heterodera cruciferae is a plant pathogenic nematode.

External links 
 Nemaplex, University of California - Heterodera cruciferae 

cruciferae
Plant pathogenic nematodes
Nematodes described in 1945